was a Japanese actor. He is most famous for playing yakuza roles. He is also known as voice actor. In 1950, he joined the Bungakuza Theatre Company. In 1963, he left the Bungakuza Theatre Company and established the Kumo Theatre Company. He appeared in more than 120 films.

Filmography

Films

Throne of Blood (1957) - Tsuzuki soldier
Nusumareta yokujô (1958)
Anyakôro (1959) - Mizutani
Kenju no okite (1960)
Kuroi gashû: Aru sarariman no shôgen (1960)
Taiyô no hakaba (1960) - Black Glasses
Banana (1960)
Happiness of Us Alone (1961)
Minami no kaze to nami (1961) - Mineo Koike
Wakarete ikiru toki mo (1961)
Netsuai sha (1961) - Tomonari
Akitsu Springs (1962) - Osaki
Ao beka monogatari (1962)
Nikui an-chikushô (1962) - Toshio Kosaka
Namida o shishi no tategami ni (1962) - Gen, the big man
Hitoribotchi no futari daga (1962) - Utsumi
Kiri no yoru no otoko (1962)
Dorodarake no junjô (1963) - Hanai
Bad Girl (1963)
Yogiri no burûsu (1963)
Tantei jimusho 2 3 - zeni to onna ni yowai otoko (1963)
Otoko no monshô (1963)
Shin meoto zenzai (1963) - Shinichi
Zoku otoko no monshô (1963)
The Insect Woman (1963) - Sawakichi
Kyojin Ôkuma Shigenobu (1963) - Kiyotaka Kuroda
Akai ka to roku denashi (1963)
Suna no ue no shokubutsu-gun (1964) - Imura
Ryojin nikki (1964) - Narrator
Otoko no monshô - kanka jô (1964)
Surai no gyanburaa (1964)
Sâtsujin sha o kêse (1964)
Otoko no monshô - fuun futatsu ryu (1964)
Otoko no monsho: hana to nagadosu (1964)
Suruga yûkyôden: Dokyô garasu (1965)
Hana saku otome tachi (1965) - Kawamoto
Kuroi tobakushi (1965)
Gyangu chôjô sakusen (1965) - Tajima
Otoko no monshô ore wa kiru (1965)
Kenju mushuku-datsy goku no buruusu (1965)
Otoko no monshô: Ryûko mujô (1966)
Zenigata Heiji (1966)
A Certain Killer (1967)
Kyôkaku-dô (1967)
Akumyō Ichidai (1967)
Shayô no omokage (1967) - Journalist
Tôkyô shigai sen (1967)
Zatoichi Challenged (1967) - Maebara of Gonzo
Zankyo no sakazuki (1967)
Shichinin no yajû: chi no sengen (1967)
Nihon ânkokushi: chî no koso (1967)
Dorifutazu desu yo! Zenshin zenshin matazenshin (1967)
Choueki juhachi-nen (1967)
Bakuchi uchi (1967)
Âa dôki no sakura (1967) - First Lieutenant Ôoka
Ah kaiten tokubetsu kogetikai (1968)
Hitori okami (1968)
Shogun's Joys of Torture (1968) - Makino Bingo-no-kami
Teppô denraiki (1968) - Matasaburo Tachibanaya
Tokugawa onna keibatsu-shi (1968) - Horichô
Outlaw: Goro the Assassin (1968) - Kensaku Kaidô
Kyûketsu dokuro-sen (1968) - Tsuji (Estate Agent)
Zankyo mujo (1968) - Hamaoka
Otoko no okite (1968)
Lady Sazen and the Drenched Swallow Sword (1968, TV Movie)
Nippon ankokushi: nasake muyô (1968)
Kanto onna yakuza (1968)
Zankoku ijô gyakutai monogatari: Genroku onna keizu (1969)
Nemuri Kyôshirô: Akujo-gari (1969)
Carta de uma flor (1969)
Ijô seiai kiroku: Harenchi (1969) - Terauchi
The Wonderful World of Puss 'n Boots (1969) - Lucifer (voice)
Tokugawa irezumi-shi: Seme jigoku (1969) - Horitatsu
Nuretsubame katageri (1969)
A Thousand and One Nights (1969) - Kamahakim (voice)
Nihon ansatsu hiroku (1969)
Horrors of Malformed Men (1969) - Hirukawa
Gonin no Shôkin Kasegi (1969) - Lord Ozeki
Tosei-nin Retsuden (1969)
Showa onna jingi (1969)
Kanto onna do konjo (1969)
Gokuaku bozu hitokiri kazoe uta (1970)
Maruhi joshidai-ryô (1970)
Shiruku hatto no ô-oyabun: chobi-hige no kuma (1970)
Shiruku hatto no ô-oyabun (1970)
Sengo hiwa, hoseki ryakudatsu (1970)
Sanbiki no mesubachi (1970)
Onsen konnyaku geisha (1970)
Hana fudâ tibakû: Ino shî ka sânban shobû (1970)
Sympathy for the Underdog (1971)
Zubeko banchô: Hamagure kazoe uta (1971) - Nakao
Animal Treasure Island (1971) - Silver (voice)
Gendai yakuza: Chizakura san kyodai (1971)
Gendai poruno-den: Sentensei inpu (1971) - Kiyoshi Ôba
Gendai yakuza: Sakazuki kaeshimasu (1971)
Boryokudan sai buso (1971)
Bakuto kirikomi-tai (1971) - Suzaki
Mesubachi no chosen (1972) - Masayoshi Kurochi, Yakuza Boss
Mamushi no kyôdai: Chôeki jûsankai (1972)
Street Mobster (1972)
Shin Zatôichi monogatari: Oreta tsue (1972) - Boss Mangoro Kagiya
Hijirimen bakuto (1972)
Lone Wolf and Cub: Baby Cart in Peril (1972) - Tokugawa Yoshinao
Nihon Aku Nin Den: Jigoku No Michizure (1972)
Kogarashi Monjirô (1972)
Furyo gai (1972)
Battles Without Honor and Humanity (1973) - Narrator
Teppôdama no bigaku (1973)
Kôkôsei burai hikae: Tsuki no Muramasa (1973) - Buchô Keiji
Battles Without Honor and Humanity: Deadly Fight in Hiroshima (1973) - Takanashi Kunimatsu
Hissatsu Shikakenin Baian Arijigoku (1973) - Sôhaku Yamazaki
Gendai ninkyô-shi (1973) - Sekiguchi
Battles Without Honor and Humanity: Police Tactics (1974)
Goyôkiba: Oni no Hanzô yawahada koban (1974) - Ishiyama
Bôryoku gai (1974) - Yoshii Haruo
Dai dâtsu gokû (1975)
Daidatsugoku (1975) - Sagawa
Afurika no hikari (1975) - Tokumatsu
Dômyaku rettô (1975) - Yamazaki
Shôrinji kenpô (1975) - Sakae Akamatsu
Tekiya no Ishimatsu (1976)
Kigeki Daiyûkai (1976) - Daisaku
Utareru mae-ni ute! (1976) - Kinugasa, a reporter
Andô Noboru no waga tôbô to sex no kiroku (1976) - Yuji Tadokoro
Yakuza senso: Nihon no Don (1977) - Katsunosuke Miura
Yakyukyô no uta (1977) - Tetsugorô Iwata
Jingi to kôsô (1977) - Yoshimatsu Sasamoto
Nippon no Don: Yabohen (1977) - Akimasa Onizawa
A Tale of Sorrow and Sadness (1977)
Inubue (1978) - Police Inspector Kamizuki
Fuyu no hana (1978)
Nihon no Don: Kanketsuhen (1978) - Fujii
Hakatakko junjô (1978) - Goro, Rokuhei's dad
Yokohama ankokugai mashingan no ryu (1978)
Sochô no kubi (1979) - Kazuaki Yashiro
Aftermath of Battles Without Honor and Humanity (1979) - Hidenobu Fujioka
The Resurrection of the Golden Wolf (1979) - Kaneko
G.I. Samurai (1979) - Koizumi Yukinaga
Nichiren (1979) - Tōjō Kagenobu
Dôran (1980) - Misumi
Harukanaru sôro (1980) - Iwataro Okabe
Shogun's Ninja (1980) - Toyotomi Hideyoshi
Swan Lake (1981) - Rothbart (voice)
Nihon Philharmonic Orchestra: Honoo no dai gogakusho (1981)
Rennyo to sono haha (1981) - Narrator (voice)
Conquest (1982) - Toru Shimoda
Antarctica (1983) - Narrator (voice)
The Geisha (1983)
Nogare no machi (1983) - Katsuichi Suzuki
Fireflies in the North (1984) - Yuhara
Shura no mure (1984) - Narration (final film role)

Television drama
Taikōki (1965) - Araki Murashige
Shinsho Taikōki (1973) - Shibata Katsuie
Kaze to Kumo to Niji to (1976) - Ono no Michikaze
Daitokai Part II (1977)
Message from Space: Galactic Wars (1978-1979) - Narrator
The Yagyu Conspiracy (1979) - Negoro Sagenta
Ōoku (1983) - Ii Naosuke

Dubbing
Columbo (Lt. Columbo (Peter Falk))
Superman (Lex Luthor (Gene Hackman))

References

External links

Japanese male film actors
20th-century Japanese male actors
Male actors from Tokyo
1931 births
1985 deaths